is a Japanese mixed martial artist competing in the Welterweight division. He is the current DEEP Welterweight Champion. A professional mixed martial artist since 2016, he has competed in the Ultimate Fighting Championship and was also the Welterweight King of Pancrase.

Background
Abe was born in Niigata Prefecture, Japan. He embarked on his martial arts journey at eight years old starting with Judo where he was the Junior Judo National Champion. During his teenage years, he trained in both boxing and kickboxing. He won the 2011 Rising Rookies Heavyweight Cup and the 2014 J-Network Light Heavyweight title in kickboxing and amassed a record of 14-10 with seven by knockout.  Abe eventually transitioned to mixed martial arts in 2016, joining Pancrase in his professional MMA debut.

Mixed martial arts career

Early career
Abe made his professional debut on April 24, 2016 against Ryosuke Igarashi at Pancrase 277 and won the fight via technical knockout 24 seconds into the first round. He won three more fights in Pancrase within the span of five months and was booked for a title fight against Hiromitsu Miura to become the Welterweight King of Pancrase. He won the fight via technical knockout in round two. He amassed a record of 5–0 prior to being signed by the UFC, vacating the title after only one month of holding it.

Ultimate Fighting Championship
Abe made his promotional debut on September 22, 2017 at  UFC Fight Night: Saint Preux vs. Okami against Hyun Gyu Lim. He won the fight via unanimous decision.

He next faced Luke Jumeau on February 10, 2018 at UFC 221. He lost the fight via unanimous decision.

His third fight came on June 23, 2018 at UFC Fight Night: Cowboy vs. Edwards against Li Jingliang. He lost the fight via unanimous decision.

In October 2018, it was announced that Abe was released from  UFC.

ONE Championship
Daichi Abe signed with ONE Championship in 2018 and was scheduled to fight former ONE welterweight title challenger Luís Santos at ONE Championship: Pursuit of Greatness on October 26, 2018. He lost the fight via TKO in the first round.

Abe next faced Ev Ting at ONE Championship: Masters of Destiny on July 12, 2019. He lost the fight via rear naked choke submission.

Return to regional circuit
Abe faced Yoichiro Sato at DEEP 95 on August 23, 2020. He won the fight via split decision.

Abe then headlined DEEP 98 against Yuta Watanabe on November 1, 2020. Abe won the fight via first-round technical knockout.

Daichi then faced Gota Yamashita for the interim DEEP Welterweight Championship at DEEP 100 on February 21, 2021. He won the fight and claimed the interim title via first-round technical knockout due to an injury. He was later promoted to undisputed champion.

Daichi faced Akira Okada at Rizin 31 - Yokohama on October 24, 2021. He lost the bout via north-south choke in the second round.

Abe was booked to face Kiichi Kunimoto at Rizin 34 – Osaka on March 20, 2022. He won the fight by unanimous decision.

Abe next fought Marcos Yoshio de Souza at Rizin 37 on July 31, 2022. He won via knockout in the second round after a strong right hook and a controversial soccer kick.

Abe faced Yukinari Tamura on October 23, 2022 at Rizin 39, and dominated from start to finish in the stands, winning a 3-0 decision.

Abe faced Shingo Suzuki on February 11, 2023 at DEEP 112 for the DEEP Welterweight Championship, losing the bout via guillotine choke in the second round.

Championships and accomplishments

Mixed martial arts
 Pancrase
Welterweight King of Pancrase (one time; former) vs. Hiromitsu Miura
DEEP
DEEP Welterweight Champion (one time; current)

Mixed martial arts record

|-
|Loss
|align=center|12–6
|Shingo Suzuki
|Submission (guillotine choke)
|DEEP 112 Impact
|
|align=center|2 
|align=center|2:05 
|Tokyo, Japan
|
|-
|Win
|align=center|12–5
|Yukinari Tamura
|Decision (unanimous)
|Rizin 39
|
|align=center|3
|align=center|5:00
|Fukuoka, Japan
|
|-
|Win
|align=center| 11–5
|Marcos Yoshio de Souza
| KO (punch and soccer kick)
|Rizin 37
|
|align=center| 2
|align=center| 3:02
|Saitama, Japan
|
|-
| Win
| align=center| 10–5
| Kiichi Kunimoto
| Decision (unanimous)
| Rizin 34
| 
| align=center| 3
| align=center| 5:00
| Osaka, Japan
| 
|-
| Loss
| align=center| 9–5
|Akira Okada
|Submission (north-south choke)
|Rizin 31
|
|align=center|2
|align=center|4:34
|Yokohama, Japan
|
|-
| Win
| align=center| 9–4
| Gota Yamashita
| TKO (finger injury)
| DEEP 100 Impact - 20th Anniversary
| 
| align=center| 1
| align=center| 2:34
| Tokyo, Japan
| 
|-
| Win
| align=center| 8–4
| Yuta Watanabe
| TKO (punches)
| DEEP 98 Impact
| 
| align=center| 1
| align=center| 4:17
| Tokyo, Japan
|
|-
| Win
| align=center| 7–4
| Yoichiro Sato
| Decision (split)
| DEEP 95 Impact
| 
| align=center| 3
| align=center| 5:00
| Tokyo, Japan
|
|-
| Loss
| align=center| 6–4
| Ev Ting
| Submission (rear-naked choke)
| ONE Championship: Masters of Destiny
| |
| align=center| 2
| align=center| 4:44
| Kuala Lumpur , Malaysia
| 
|-
|Loss
| align=center| 6–3
| Luís Santos
| TKO (body kick)
| ONE FC: Pursuit of Greatness
| 
| align=center| 1
| align=center| 0:33
| Yangon, Myanmar
| 
|-
|Loss
| align=center| 6–2
| Li Jingliang
| Decision (unanimous)
| UFC Fight Night: Cowboy vs. Edwards
| 
| align=center| 3
| align=center| 5:00
| Kallang, Singapore
|
|-
|Loss
| align=center| 6–1
| Luke Jumeau
| Decision (unanimous)
| UFC 221
| 
| align=center| 3 
| align=center| 5:00
| Perth, Western Australia, Australia
|
|-
| Win
| align=center| 6–0
| Hyun Gyu Lim
| Decision (unanimous)
| UFC Fight Night: Saint Preux vs. Okami
| 
| align=center| 3
| align=center| 5:00
| Saitama, Saitama, Japan
| 
|-
| Win
| align=center| 5–0
| Hiromitsu Miura
| TKO (punches)
| Pancrase 288
| 
| align=center| 2
| align=center| 0:26
| Tokyo, Japan
|
|-
| Win
| align=center| 4–0
| Bryson Kamaka
| KO (punches)
| Mid-Pac: Mid-Pacific Championships
| 
| align=center| 1
| align=center| 0:35
| Waipahu, Hawaii, United States
|
|-
| Win
| align=center| 3–0
| Kenta Takagi
| Decision (unanimous)
| Pancrase 282
| 
| align=center| 3
| align=center| 5:00
| Tokyo, Japan
|
|-
| Win
| align=center| 2–0
| Yuta Nakamura
| KO (punch)
| Pancrase 280
| 
| align=center| 1
| align=center| 2:08
| Tokyo, Japan
|
|-
| Win
| align=center| 1–0
| Ryosuke Igarashi
| TKO (punches)
| Pancrase 277
| 
| align=center| 1
| align=center| 0:24
| Tokyo, Japan
|
|-

See also
 List of male mixed martial artists

References

External links
 
 

1991 births
Living people
Japanese male mixed martial artists
Welterweight mixed martial artists
Ultimate Fighting Championship male fighters
Mixed martial artists utilizing judo
Mixed martial artists utilizing kickboxing
Mixed martial artists utilizing boxing
Japanese male judoka
Japanese male kickboxers